is a former Japanese football player.

Playing career
Tada was born in Okayama Prefecture on August 11, 1982. After graduating from high school, he joined Cerezo Osaka in 2001. He could not play at all in the match behind Seigo Shimokawa until 2002. In July 2003, he became a regular goalkeeper instead Shimokawa and played all 19 matches until end of 2003 season. Although he played first 2 matches in 2004 season, Cerezo lost both matches and he lost his position. After that, he could hardly play in the match until 2007. In 2008, he moved to Ehime FC. He battles with Yusuke Kawakita for the position and played 21 matches. In 2009, he re-joined Cerezo Osaka. However he could hardly play in the match behind Kim Jin-hyeon. He moved to Omiya Ardija in 2010 and Gainare Tottori in 2011. However he could not play at all in the match both clubs. In 2012, he moved to FC Gifu and became a regular goalkeeper. However he lost his position behind Shogo Tokihisa in June and he left the club end of the season. In April 2013, he re-joined Cerezo Osaka. However he could not play at all in the match. In 2014, he moved to Thailand and joined Sriracha. He retired end of 2014 season.

Club statistics

References

External links

1982 births
Living people
Association football people from Okayama Prefecture
Japanese footballers
J1 League players
J2 League players
Cerezo Osaka players
Ehime FC players
Omiya Ardija players
Gainare Tottori players
FC Gifu players
Association football goalkeepers